Our Daughter is a 1981 Cameroonian drama film directed by Daniel Kamwa. It was entered into the 12th Moscow International Film Festival. The film was also selected as the Cameroonian entry for the Best Foreign Language Film at the 53rd Academy Awards, but was not accepted as a nominee.

Cast
 Nicole Okala as Colette - l'amie snob de Charlottte
 Daniel Kamwa as André
 Stanislas Awona as Mbarga - le père qui vient d'épouser sa huitième femme
 Elise Atangana as Mme Mbarga
 Berthe Mbia as Charlotte Mbarga - une jeune fonctionnaire moderne
 Florence Niasse as Maria
 Lucien Mamba as Le domestique
 Francis Messi
 Berthe Ebe Evina as Martha

See also
 List of submissions to the 53rd Academy Awards for Best Foreign Language Film
 List of Cameroonian submissions for the Academy Award for Best Foreign Language Film

References

External links
 

1981 films
1981 drama films
Cameroonian drama films
1980s French-language films